Leon Aurdal (23 January 1890 – 25 January 1949) was a Norwegian painter.

He was born in Bergen to Bastian Aurdal and Severine Grebstad. He was married twice, first to Kristmar Aurdal, and from 1944 to textile artist Synnøve Anker Aurdal. His works include Sittende ung dame from 1925, Semsvatnet from 1938, and På lokalbåten from 1945, all at the National Gallery of Norway. He is also represented in galleries in Bergen, Trondheim, Stavanger, Fredrikstad and Drammen.

References

1890 births
1949 deaths
Artists from Bergen
20th-century Norwegian painters
Norwegian male painters
Norwegian landscape painters
Norwegian portrait painters
20th-century Norwegian male artists